Faustino Raineri  (died 1755) was an Italian painter, mainly a landscape painter of the Baroque period, mainly active in Brescia.

Raineri appears to have become a priest. He followed the style of vedute of Antonio Tempesta, painting outdoors. His close friend Gaudenzio Botti was also his pupil. The lack of varnish in his painting has led most to decay.

References

1755 deaths
18th-century Italian painters
Italian male painters
Painters from Brescia
Year of birth unknown
18th-century Italian male artists